Adalbertia is a genus of moths in the family Geometridae.

Species
 Adalbertia castiliaria (Staudinger, 1900)
 Adalbertia cortes
 Adalbertia dumonti
 Adalbertia duponti

References
 Adalbertia at Markku Savela's Lepidoptera and some other life forms

Campaeini
Geometridae genera